Fairlawn is a historic mansion at 189 May Street in Worcester, Massachusetts.  It is now part of the main building of the Fairlawn Rehabilitation Hospital.  The mansion (and the accompanying estate) were the property of James Norcross, a nationally prominent builder whose Norcross Brothers firm was engaged in construction projects involving famous architects, including H. H. Richardson and McKim, Mead & White. The Norcross brothers were also locally prominent, building a number of Worcester landmarks and operating a factory in the city which produced architectural parts.

James Norcross moved to Worcester in 1868, and assembled  of land along May Street beginning in 1890. Stylistically, the house is sui generis, although it has a number of architectural elements that were popular in the revival styles of the time. The front facade's main feature is a round bay, rising three full stories to a cupola, which is surrounded by a single story porch supported by slender round columns. A similar bay is centered on the rear facade, although it lacks the cupola. Each of the building's four corners has a rounded bay section rising three floors which is topped by a shed roof.

Norcross lived in the house until his death in 1903, and it remained in his family until 1922, when the estate was sold to the Fairlawn Rehabilitation Hospital. The hospital built additions to the house on each side (one c. 1951, the other in 1970), both built of brick. They are connected to the main house by narrow corridor sections, and do not detract from the main house's style. There is a stable behind the house which was likely also built by Norcross.

The house was listed on the National Register of Historic Places in 1980.

See also

National Register of Historic Places listings in southwestern Worcester, Massachusetts
National Register of Historic Places listings in Worcester County, Massachusetts

References

Buildings and structures in Worcester, Massachusetts
National Register of Historic Places in Worcester, Massachusetts
Houses on the National Register of Historic Places in Worcester County, Massachusetts